The California state elections in 2020 were held on Tuesday, November 3, 2020. Unlike previous election cycles, the primary elections were held on Super Tuesday, March 3, 2020.

In addition to the U.S. presidential race, California voters elected all of California's seats to the House of Representatives, all of the seats of the State Assembly, and all odd-numbered seats of the State Senate. Neither of the state's two U.S. Senate seats were up for election in 2020.

Pursuant to Proposition 14 passed in 2010, California uses a nonpartisan blanket primary for almost all races, with the presidential primary races being the notable exception. Under the nonpartisan blanket primary system, all the candidates for the same elected office, regardless of respective political party, run against each other at once during the primary. The candidates receiving the most and second-most votes in the primary election then become the contestants in the general election.

President of the United States

California, a stronghold for the Democratic Party, has 55 electoral votes in the Electoral College. Joe Biden won with 63% of the popular vote. On December 14, 2020, California cast its electoral votes for Joe Biden.

United States House of Representatives

There are 53 U.S. Representatives in California that were all up for election. The Democratic Party won 42 seats while the Republican Party won 11 seats. Three districts were gained by the Republican Party: the 21st, 39th, and 48th.

State Senate

The 20 California State Senators in the odd-numbered districts were up for election. Out of the contested seats, Democrats won 17 and Republicans won 3. The resulting composition was 31 Democrats and 9 Republicans. Two districts were gained by the Democratic Party: the 29th and 37th.

State Assembly

All 80 representatives in the California State Assembly were up for election. The resulting composition was 60 Democrats, 19 Republicans, and one independent. The Republican Party gained the 38th district.

Propositions
Since the passage of a November 2011 law, only propositions placed on the ballot by the state legislature may appear on the primary ballot, and all qualifying measures placed via petition are automatically moved to the general election ballot.

Primary election
 Proposition 13: Public Preschool, K-12, and College Health and Safety Bond Act of 2020 (Assembly Bill 48) - Failed
 Prop 13 was a $15 billion bond measure to fund seismic retrofitting and other capital improvements on various California public preschool, K-12, and college campuses. Supporters argued that these improvements would make public schools safer and healthier. Opponents said that the actual total cost of the bonds plus interest would exceed $27 billion, more expensive than using funds directly from the regular state budget. It failed by a margin of 6 percentage points.

General election
 Proposition 14
 Stem Cell Research, Treatments, and Cures Initiative. Initiative Statute. This will authorize $5.5 billion in bonds to help fund various grants issued by the California Institute for Regenerative Medicine, specifically for stem cell and other medical research, medical training, and the construction of new research facilities. It passed by a small margin of 2 percentage points.

 Proposition 15
Schools and Local Communities Funding Act. Initiative Constitutional Amendment. This will increases funding for K-12 public schools, community colleges, and local governments by amending portions of 1978's Proposition 13, requiring commercial and industrial properties to be taxed based on current market value instead of their purchase price. Exempts those owners with a combined value of $3 million or less, small businesses from personal property taxes, and $500,000 worth of personal property of non-small businesses. This initiative failed by a margin of four percentage points.

 Proposition 16
 Assembly Constitutional Amendment 5. This mandatory proposition, placed by the state legislature and the Governor, will repeal 1996's Proposition 209. Proposition 209 prohibits the state from discriminating against, or granting preferential treatment to, any individual or group on the basis of race, sex, color, ethnicity, or national origin in the operation of public employment, public education, or public contracting. This initiative was rejected by a margin of 14 percentage points.

 Proposition 17
 Assembly Constitutional Amendment 6. This mandatory proposition, placed by the state legislature and the Governor, will amend the state constitution to allow people with felonies who are on parole to vote. This margin passed by a margin of 17 percentage points.

 Proposition 18
 Assembly Constitutional Amendment 4. This mandatory proposition, placed by the state legislature and the Governor, will amend the state constitution to allow 17-year-olds to vote in primary and special elections if they will turn 18 by the subsequent general election. This initiative failed by a margin of 12 percentage points.

 Proposition 19
 Assembly Constitutional Amendment 11. This mandatory proposition, placed by the state legislature and the Governor, will amend the state constitution, specifically portions of 1978's Proposition 13 by allowing homeowners who are over 55 years old or severely disabled to transfer their property tax base from their old home to their new one, regardless of the new residence's property value or location. The property tax base can be transferred up to three times instead of one. The proposition will require that inherited homes that are not used as principal residences be reassessed at market value when transferred. Revenue generated from these provisions will be allocated to wildfire agencies and counties. It passed by a margin of 2 percentage points.

 Proposition 20
 Reducing Crime and Keeping California Safe Act. Initiative Statute. This proposition will, among others, expand the list of crimes that do not allow early parole, recategorizes particular misdemeanor crimes as instead ones that are chargeable as either misdemeanors or felonies, and require the collection DNA samples from anybody convicted of particular misdemeanors. California voters decisively rejected this initiative by a margin of 23 percentage points.

 Proposition 21
 Rent Affordability. Initiative Statute. Would allow local governments to establish rent control on residential properties that have been occupied for over 15 years. Would also allow landlords who own no more than two homes to exempt themselves from these new policies. This would essentially repeal some of the provisions in the 1995 Costa–Hawkins Rental Housing Act. California voters rejected this initiative by a margin of 20 percentage points.

 Proposition 22
 Protect-App-Based Drivers and Services Act. Initiative Statute. This proposition will define all app-based transportation (rideshare) and delivery drivers as independent contractors for the purposes of labor and wage laws. This would override 2019's Assembly Bill 5, which implemented a three-part test to determine whether such a driver should be classified as an independent contractor or an employee. This measure passed by a margin of 17 percentage points.

 Proposition 23
 Protect the Lives of Dialysis Patients Act. Initiative Statute. This proposition will require chronic dialysis clinics to have at least one on-site licensed physician while patients are being treated, report dialysis-related infection data to both the state health department and the federal CDC, gain approval from the state health department before closing a clinic, and to not discriminate against patients based on their source of payment for care, among others. California voters decisively rejected this initiative by 27 percentage points.

 Proposition 24
 Privacy Rights and Enforcement Act. Initiative Statute. This propositions will expand provisions first implemented by the California Consumer Privacy Act. Among other additions, the proposition will allow customers to direct businesses from sharing their personal information and to make corrections to inaccurate personal information without any penalty. In addition, businesses will need to obtain permission before collecting data from consumers younger than 16, or permission from a parent or guardian before collecting data from consumers younger than 13. It will also establish a new state department called the California Privacy Protection Agency to enforce the consumer privacy laws. This measure was approved by a margin of 12 percentage points.

 Proposition 25
 Referendum to Overturn a 2018 Law That Replaced Money Bail System with A System Based on Public Safety Risk. A referendum (placed on the ballot via petition) on Senate Bill 10 passed by the state legislature in 2018 that replaces the state's current cash bail system with a risk assessment-based bail system. A majority of Californians voted no on this measure, which means that the previous system of cash bail will remain in place. It failed by a margin of 13 percentage points.

References

Further reading

External links 
California Official Voter Information Guide

 
California